Emma Lee is a television presenter and former catwalk model, she has presented productions which have gone on to receive RTS and BAFTA recognition and has presented on GMTV and ITV1's The Zone.

Presenting career
After appearing in modelling appearing in campaigns, Lee made her television debut on Channel 4's Watch This Space, where the nation voted for her to front her very own live youth magazine show.

Television credits include RTS-nominated Reactive and The Friday Zone for BBC1, The Big Breakfast for Channel 4 and Nickelodeon,

Lee lives in London with husband, television presenter Tim Dixon – with whom she manages a production company and interactive agency called Insidemedia.

Credits
Watch This Space Presenter of interactive magazine for Channel 4
Reactive Show dedicated to computer games and competitions for CBBC.
Telegantic Megavision Saturday morning show for ITV1.
Reach For The Top Documentary programme for BBC One
Technik Factual science show for young viewers on Nickelodeon UK
Friday Zone hour long show of sketches and competitions.
Pulling Power  Entertainment motoring programme for Carlton Central
You'll Never Believe It!,ITV1.
Disney Channel Kids Awards (Yearly) BAFTA winning live award ceremony, for Disney Channel UK, Sky One, and Channel Five
Studio Disney / Disney Channel presenter Live weekday show.
"The National Lottery", presenter, 2007
Virgin Sports News news anchor, 2008–2009
"Sky Movies" presenter, 2009
The Fluffy Club (GMTV) presenter, 2010
"The Zone ITV1" presenter, 2010
"Planet Wild", ITV, family gameshow  – 2010
"Jackpot247.com", Freeview ch39 – 2012
William Hill Casino TV, CSJHDN TV, 2025, with Alfie Deyes and Kerry Newell.

References

External links
SHOWREEL.
Disney Channel Official Website.

Living people
British television presenters
GMTV presenters and reporters
Year of birth missing (living people)